Kannada films of 2020
Kannada films of 2021
Kannada films of 2022
Kannada films of 2023
Kannada films of 2024
Kannada films of 2025
Kannada films of 2026
Kannada films of 2027
Kannada films of 2028
Kannada films of 2029

2020s
Kannada-language
Films, Kannada